Bolostromoides is a monotypic genus of South American wafer trapdoor spiders containing the single species, Bolostromoides summorum. It was first described by R. D. Schiapelli & B. S. Gerschman in 1945, and has only been found in Venezuela.

References

Cyrtaucheniidae
Monotypic Mygalomorphae genera
Mygalomorphae genera
Spiders of South America